Curtis is a municipality of northwestern Spain in the province of A Coruña, in the autonomous community of Galicia.  Its capital is Teixeiro, where its town hall is located. It belongs to the comarca of Betanzos. Curtis has a population of 4,244 inhabitants (INE, 2008). Footballer Lucas Vázquez was born in Curtis in 1991.

References

Municipalities in the Province of A Coruña